From Stone Orchard is a memoir by Timothy Findley, published in 1998.

The book, which includes some articles Findley had originally written for Harrowsmith magazine, is a memoir of Findley's life at Stone Orchard, the farm near Cannington, Ontario where he lived with his partner William Whitehead.

Books by Timothy Findley
1998 non-fiction books
HarperCollins books
Canadian memoirs